Exostoma vinciguerrae is a species of sisorid catfish from Myanmar and India.

Etymology
The fish is named in honor of physician-ichthyologist Decio Vinciguerra (1856–1934).

References

Vishwanath, W. and H. Joyshree, 2007. A new Sisorid catfish of the genus Exostoma Blith from Manipur, India. Zoo's Print Journal 22(1):2531–2534.

Catfish of Asia
Fish of India
Fish of Myanmar
Taxa named by Charles Tate Regan
Fish described in 1905
Sisoridae